Phillip Sims (born August 15, 1992) is an American football coach and former player. He played college football at Alabama, Virginia and Winston-Salem State. After going undrafted in the 2015 NFL Draft, Sims was signed by the Arizona Cardinals. He also played professionally for the Seattle Seahawks and the Saskatchewan Roughriders. In 2017, Sims was named the head football coach at John Marshall High School. As of now, he is the head coach at J.R. Tucker High School.

Early years
Sims attended Oscar F. Smith High School in Chesapeake, Virginia where he graduated in 2010. Sims was one of the top recruits coming out of high school and was a five star recruit.

College career

Alabama Crimson Tide
Coming out of high school Sims committed to play football for Alabama. Sims sat out for his true freshman season in 2010 to redshirt. In 2011 Sims was the backup quarterback to A. J. McCarron and played in eight different games. Sims was a member of the team that won the 2012 BCS National Championship Game.

Virginia Cavaliers 
Sims transferred to Virginia from Alabama in May 2012 and was granted a waiver by the NCAA to play immediately due to his father’s health situation. He appeared in all 12 games during the 2012 season throwing for 1,263 yards with 9 touchdowns and 4 interceptions.

Winston-Salem State Rams
Sims transferred to Winston-Salem State from Virginia in 2013 after being ruled academically ineligible at Virginia. Sims was forced to sit out for the 2013 season due to transfer rules. In 2014 Sims played in all 11 games. Splitting time at QB, Sims was team’s leading passer completing 118-of-198 passes for 1,560 yards and 15 TDs with just 4 INTs.

Professional career

Arizona Cardinals
On May 2, 2015, after going undrafted, Sims was invited to an Arizona Cardinals' rookie camp on a tryout basis. On May 10, 2015, Sims was signed by the Cardinals. On September 4, 2015, Sims was waived from the Cardinals' roster as part of their roster cuts to 53 players.

Seattle Seahawks
On January 4, 2016, Sims signed a futures contract with the Seattle Seahawks. On April 28, 2016, Sims was waived by the Seattle Seahawks after less than a year with the team.

Saskatchewan Roughriders
On June 6, 2016, Sims was signed by the Saskatchewan Roughriders of the Canadian Football League (CFL).

Coaching career
In 2017, Sims was named the head football coach at John Marshall High School in Virginia.

On January 31, 2020, Sims accepted the head coaching position at J.R. Tucker High School in Henrico County, also in the Richmond metropolitan area.

References

External links
Seattle Seahawks bio 
Arizona Cardinals bio 
Winston-Salem State Rams bio 
Virginia Cavaliers bio 
Alabama Crimson Tide bio

1992 births
Living people
Sportspeople from Chesapeake, Virginia
Players of American football from Virginia
American football quarterbacks
Canadian football quarterbacks
American players of Canadian football
Alabama Crimson Tide football players
Virginia Cavaliers football players
Winston-Salem State Rams football players
Arizona Cardinals players
Seattle Seahawks players
Saskatchewan Roughriders players
High school football coaches in Virginia